Hungary v El Salvador was the second game to be played in Group 3 of the first group stage at the 1982 FIFA World Cup. The game was played at Nuevo Estadio in Elche, Spain on 15 June between the men's national football teams of Hungary and El Salvador. Hungary won the match 10–1, recording the biggest scoreline in men's FIFA World Cup finals history.	

Hungarian substitute László Kiss scored a hat-trick, the only World Cup hat-trick by a substitute, and the fastest ever in a World Cup, in the space of seven minutes.

Background
Hungary had the experience of playing in the final of both the 1938 and 1954 World Cups. El Salvador's qualification for the world cup was made when the country was in the throes of civil war.

The preparation of the Salvadorans for the World Cup was altered due to the war. They struggled to make friendlies and training sessions were frequently disrupted. According to the World Cup's technical report: El Salvador had a very good preparatory programme, mainly with emphasis on endurance, speed and strength. The program was very interesting, but as it happened, the special political circumstances in the country prevented the final stage from being carried out in as concentrated a way as one would have actually wished.

Prior to the World Cup, El Salvador sent a 20-man squad (as opposed to a 22-man squad) for economic reasons. Hungary sent their full team. The Salvadoran team was the last team to arrive in Spain, arriving 3 days before the match against Hungary. On the eve of the game, the Salvadoran players watched a video of the Hungarian team in action, which was purchased from a Spanish agent.

The draw for the group stage of the 1982 World Cup paired Hungary and El Salvador with Argentina and Belgium in Group 3. Before the game, holders Argentina had lost 1–0 to Belgium in the opening game of the tournament. Despite this win, Hungary collected only one more point in the group stage and failed to qualify for the second round.

The win equalised with Yugoslavia 9–0 win over Zaire in the 1974 FIFA World Cup, with a nine-goal margin separating.

Match

Details

See also
Spain 10–0 Tahiti (2013 FIFA Confederations Cup)
United States v Thailand (2019 FIFA Women's World Cup)

References

1982 FIFA World Cup
FIFA World Cup matches
Hungary national football team matches
El Salvador national football team matches
Hungary at the 1982 FIFA World Cup
El Salvador at the 1982 FIFA World Cup
Record association football wins
Sport in Elche
June 1982 sports events in Europe